Hati Tayo sa Magdamag is a 1988 Filipino romantic drama film directed by Lupita A. Kashiwahara and written by Armando Lao. Adapted from the Extra Special Komiks "komik" of the same name by Sally Esteban, it stars Edu Manzano, Tetchie Agbayani, Jacklyn Jose, Francis Magalona, Armida Siguion Reyna, Caridad Sanchez and Eddie Rodriguez. Produced by Viva Films, the film was released on March 9, 1988.

Critic Lav Diaz gave Hati Tayo sa Magdamag a mixed review, stating that the film is "not too good and not quite a failure" while giving praise to Jose's performance.

Cast
Edu Manzano as Jerry "Greggy" Pangilinan
Tetchie Agbayani as Antonette Revilla
Jacklyn Jose as Rochelle San Juan
Francis Magalona as Arthur
Armida Siguion Reyna as Doña Concha Revilla
Caridad Sanches as Aling Pinang
Eddie Rodriguez as Don Teofilo Revilla
Janice Jurado as Don Teofilo's girlfriend
Tina Loy as Nana Viring
Junix Inocian as Mr. Diwa
Jun Roy as Mang Selo
Tito Tesoro as Mang Tito
Freddie Papa as Mang Johnny
Marie Barbacui as Inday
Butch Gonzales as professor
Dr. Joseph Laureta as doctor
Anna Ascalon as nurse
Alma Lerma as Doña Concha's friend
Bessie Barredo as Doña Concha's friend
Remy Novales as Doña Concha's friend

Production
Hati Tayo sa Magdamag is director Lupita A. Kashiwahara's first theatrical film in many years, and is based on the Extra Special Komiks "komik" of the same by Sally Esteban.

Release
Hati Tayo sa Magdamag was rated "A" by the Movie and Television Review and Classification Board (MTRCB), indicating a "Very Good" quality, and was released on March 9 or 10, 1988.

Critical response
Lav Diaz, writing for the Manila Standard, gave Hati Tayo sa Magdamag a mixed review, stating that the film is "not too good and not quite a failure. It has intense scenes and it has some that can be open to interpretation." He also praised Jaclyn Jose's performance and the screenplay's lack of overly poetic dialogue, the latter of which he noted is a common trait among films produced by Viva Films, but he lamented the fact that a slapping scene still remained in the film, stating that "only one slap was done but this was a deafening crack on the film." He concluded on a positive note that the film is a step in the right direction for the studio to change its traditions.

References

External links

1988 films
1988 romance films
1988 romantic drama films
Filipino-language films
Films based on Philippine comics
Philippine films based on comics
Philippine romance films
Viva Films films